Pett is a village and civil parish in the Rother district of East Sussex, England.

The road through the village leads down to the second village in the parish: Pett Level, the coastal part of which is known as Cliff End. Here there is a beach and, as the name suggests, the Weald sandstone cliffs reach their easternmost point. Pett Level marks the end of both the Royal Military Canal and the western end of the 1940s sea defence wall. The Saxon Shore Way passes through Pett Level.
Pett parish church is dedicated to St Mary and St Peter. Pett also has a Methodist chapel, and a small Church of England church at Cliff End.

History
The manor of Pett belonged to a succession of families, including the Halle family, the Levett family, the Fletchers and the Medleys, before eventually passing to the Earls of Liverpool.

Landmarks

There is a Site of Special Scientific Interest partly within the parish. Hastings Cliffs to Pett Beach runs along the coast and is of both biological and geological interest. The cliffs hold many fossils and have many habitats, including ancient woodland and shingle beaches. These include a sunken forest, a warship which is thought to have sank in 1690, a lost series of Martello towers  and at Cliff End the beach has some fossils and some dinosaur footprints from the Lower Cretaceous.

Sunken forest 
A sunken forest that can be seen in the sand at low tide in the shore opposite the levels. It is a relic of a past  8000 years ago when sea levels were about 100 ft (30m) lower than today. The melting of glaciers has since raised the sea level worldwide. The forest can be seen as spongy wooden roots , fallen trunks and tree stumps across large areas in the sand. Sea conditions may bury the remains in sand from time to time  until uncovered again by storms.  The trees have been  identified as oak, birch and hazel.

Wreck of HMS Anne 
HMS Anne was a 70-gun third rate ship of the line of the English Royal Navy,  launched in 1678. She was badly damaged at the Battle of Beachy Head on 30 June 1690. Her captain beached her here and she was set on fire to prevent capture by the French. Her remains were  discovered when the vessel was partly dug up by a mechanical excavator in 1974. The wreck is usually exposed by low tides which are below 0.6m above the chart datum (Dover). She lies in sand on a firm clay substrate on top of the  prehistoric submerged forest. An explanatory panel is placed opposite her location on the sea wall.

In popular culture
Pett Level beach was the filming location for parts of the video of David Bowie's 1980 number one hit single "Ashes to Ashes." Jonathan Miller filmed the beach scenes for his 1966 TV film of Alice in Wonderland at Pett Level. Sir John Gielgud played the Mock Turtle and Malcolm Muggeridge was the Gryphon.

References

External links

Villages in East Sussex
Civil parishes in East Sussex
Rother District